Paul Ooghe (17 May 1899 – 8 September 2001) was a Belgian soldier who, and at the time of his death, was incorrectly believed to be the last surviving Belgian soldier to have seen combat in World War I. The actual last surviving veteran, Cyrillus-Camillus Barbary, who had emigrated to the United States, died in 2004.

World War I service
In 1916, he escaped from German-occupied Belgium and traveled to the Netherlands, England, and finally France to join the Belgian Army which was fighting at a northern section of the Western Front, known as the Yser Front. At the age of 16, Ooghe lied about his age in order to enlist. He first joined the cavalry (5e régiment des Lanciers), then the grenadiers (1er régiment des Grenadiers).

As he was in charge of the maintenance of the telephone and telegraph lines, Ooghe was often in the front line, also involved in action.  At the end of March 1917, he participated in an attack against a German bunker in Rekkem and was very nearly killed. On 11 November 1918, while on duty and eager to celebrate the armistice, the Germans bombarded the positions where Ooghe was stationed and ten of his companions perished before the bugle sounded the end of the conflict. This was a traumatic experience that Ooghe would not forget.

Post War activities
Ooghe was a recipient of numerous honors and awards and was until his death often regarded as the last living Belgian survivor of World War I. He was a regular participant in the annual commemorations of the war and was often willing to speak at length about his experiences and the futility of conflict. His aim was to infuse a civic sense in young people, as well as the importance of keeping the memory of the conflict alive.

Death
Ooghe died on 8 September 2001 due to weakness after having suffered from bronchitis for several months. He was 102 years old. Up until a short time before his death, he was widely announced as being the last surviving Belgian World War I veteran. The last Belgian veteran of the war, Cyrillus-Camillus Barbary, died in the United States in 2004.

Notes

1899 births
2001 deaths
People from Laeken
Belgian military personnel of World War I
Belgian centenarians
Men centenarians